Petre Mărmureanu (born 20 June 1941) is a Romanian-American former professional tennis player.

Mărmureanu played for the Romania Davis Cup team in 1962 and 1963, then from 1969 to 1972. His second stint in the team included three runner-up finishes, where he was the team's reserve to the preferred combination of Ilie Năstase and Ion Țiriac. He made the singles third round of the French Open on three occasions and was a men's doubles quarter-finalist in 1972 with Barry Phillips-Moore.

In 1975 he defected to the United States and later served as a coach on the U.S. Federation Cup team.

See also
List of Romania Davis Cup team representatives

References

Further reading

External links
 
 
 

1941 births
Living people
Romanian male tennis players
Romanian defectors
Romanian emigrants to the United States
Medalists at the 1965 Summer Universiade
Universiade bronze medalists for Romania
Universiade medalists in tennis